This is the career statistics of British tennis player Cameron Norrie.

Performance timelines

Singles 
Current through the 2023 Mexican Open.

Doubles

Significant finals

Masters 1000 finals

Singles: 1 (1 title)

ATP career finals

Singles: 14 (5 titles, 9 runner-ups)

Doubles: 1 (1 title)

ATP Challenger Tour and ITF Futures finals

Singles: 9 (6 titles, 3 runner–ups)

Doubles: 2 (1 title, 1 runner–up)

Record against other players

Norrie's record against players who have been ranked in the top 10, with those who are active in boldface. Only ATP Tour main draw matches are considered:

Top 10 wins
Norrie has a  record against players who were, at the time the match was played, ranked in the top 10.

Notes

References

External links

Norrie, Cameron